The boukólos rule is a phonological rule of the Proto-Indo-European language (PIE). It states that a labiovelar stop dissimilates to an ordinary velar stop next to the vowel  or its corresponding glide .

If the labiovelar had not undergone dissimilation, the word should have turned out as *, as in the analogously constructed  "goatherd" < . The same dissimilated form  is the ancestor of Proto-Celtic , the source of Welsh  (which would have had -b- rather than -g- if it had come from a form with *-kʷ-) and Irish , which is the common word for "boy" in the modern language.

Another example could be the Greek negation , which Warren Cowgill has interpreted as coming from pre-Greek  < , meaning approximately "not on your life". Without the boukólos rule, the result would have been *.

The rule is also found in Germanic, mainly in verbs, where labiovelars are delabialised by the epenthetic -u- inserted before syllabic resonants:
 Old High German  ("to come"), past participle  ("come"), from Proto-Germanic  and 

References

Indo-European linguistics
Sound laws